The Seinan Gakuin Green Dolphins football program represents Seinan Gakuin University in college football. Seinan is a member of the Kyūshū Collegiate American Football Association.

External links
 
American football in Japan
1973 establishments in Japan
American football teams established in 1973